The Ashrayan Project, also known as the Ashrayan-2 Project, is a  development project funded by the Government of Bangladesh under Prime Minister's Office Bangladesh tasked with building homes for homeless and displaced people. Joint Secretary Abu Saleh Mohammed Ferdous khan is the project director of the project now.

History

The Ashrayan project is a brainchild of the Honourable Prime Minister Sheikh Hasina. To ensure people's economic and political rights and democracy, she rushed from one end of the country to the other and saw the reality of the people. And after a long time, Awami League government led by Sheikh Hasina, daughter of Bangabandhu, came to power in 1996. On 19 May 1997, a cyclone hit the coastal areas including the south-eastern district of Cox's Bazar of the country severely.

Honorable Prime Minister Sheikh Hasina visited St. Martin of Cox’bazaar on May 20, 1997, and felt shocked at seeing the helplessness of the homeless and uprooted families affected by the cyclone on May 19, 1997. She ordered the authority concerned to rehabilitate the cyclone-affected landless and homeless people. In response to the call of the HPM, a local Awami League leader came forward and donated his land to rehabilitate the landless and homeless people. This way a project called 'Ashrayan' in 1997 was established to help the landless, homeless, and distressed people of the country.  Under this project, pucca barracks are built in the Cyclone, Sidre and Ila affected areas, and Semi-Pucca barracks in other areas of the country. There is also a provision to construct houses with a special design for the tribal people of three hill districts in harmony with their cultural heritage and tradition.

Ashrarayan-2 is a project related to poverty alleviation through rehabilitation and income-generating activities. The project provides various income-generating need-based training like handicrafts, poultry, psiculture, gardening, agriculture, cattle rearing, etc. The project aims at creating a dynamic village and stimulating the socio-economic development of the people rehabilitated through the Ashrayan Project. This project is a Social Safety Net Programme of the government.

Objectives 
 To rehabilitate landless, homeless, rootless, and distressed families.
 To provide credit and training on different livelihood activities to the beneficiaries
 To alleviate poverty through the creation of income-generating activities.

Activities 
 Selection of area for establishment of homeless families through identifying suitable khasland/resumed/donated land and if necessary purchased land.
 Selection of homeless families in the Upazilla level.
 Construction of pucca, semi-pucca, CI sheet barrack houses, and single houses.
 Providing nee1.	d based training and credit to stakeholders.
 Tree plantation in the project area.
 Construction of houses for homeless people on their own land.
 Construction of multistoried buildings in City Corporation, Divisional Headquarters and Pourashava area, etc.
 Construction of Community centres in the project.
 Construction of internal road in the project.
 Excavation of pond in the project.
 Formation of cooperative societies in the project village.

Achievement of the Ashrayan project from 1997 to April/2022 

FY	Number of barrack houses Constructed	Number of families Rehabilitated

1997-2002	4721(10-unit barrack houses)	47,210

2002-2010	5871(10-unit barrack houses)	58,703

2010-2022	11572(10/5-unit barrack houses)	62,135

2014-2019	Construction of houses on one’s own land	1,53,853

2010-2021	houses have been built for the Tribal people.	580

tong houses have been built for Rakhain people	20

With the funding of Bangladesh Bank’s housing fund (Grihayon Tohobil), families, affected by cyclone Amphan and river erosion, were given houses.

1,100

Multistoried building for Khuruskul special Ashrayan project	640

Single Houses to the families on the occasion of Mujibborsho, on two dcml of khas land.	1,83,157

Total families rehabilitated (1997 to April, 22	5,07,398

Total numbers of 5,07,398 families have been rehabilitated from 1997 to April/2022 through the Ashrayan project in the barrack house, owner's land and semi-pucca single house on two dcml of khas land.

Construction of semi-pucca single house in two dcml of khas land in Mujibborsho 

On the occasion of Mujibborsho, the Honourable Prime Minister Sheikh Hasina declared- `Not a single person in the country will remain homeless.' The Deputy Commissioners of 64 districts, under the direct supervision of the Ashrayan project, prepared a list of all landless and homeless families in the country in June 2020 to materialize the declaration of the Honourable Prime Minister Sheikh Hasina. According to the list, there are currently 2,35,422 landless and homeless families in the country and 5,92,261 families with land but no capability to build houses. Due to modification of list in the Upazilla level, it is increasing as well as decreasing somewhere.  

The Honourable Prime Minister Sheikh Hasina approved `the home providing policy guideline-2021’ for the landless and homeless people of the country in May 2020. On the occasion of Mujib borsho, in the first phase, a two-room semi-pucca house for 1,83,003 families has been constructed (title deed jointly in the name of both husband and wife) allocating of 2(two) dcml of government khas land. Providing homes for 1,83,157 families has become a rare history. The Honorable Prime Minister inaugurated the programmes of houses handing over ceremony on January 23, 2021, June 20, 2021, and April 26, 2022, consequently. This project is the brainchild of the Honourable Prime Minister Sheikh Hasina. This initiative is reducing the rate of poverty in the country to a greater extent.

The following activities are carried out for the socio-economic development of the beneficiaries of the project

Training 
A 10-day trade-based training is imparted among the beneficiaries to increase their efficiency on specific trades. A number of 2,78,896 beneficiaries have been given trade-based training.

Formation of Co-operative society 
A cooperative society is formed in every Ashrayan village with the beneficiaries as a member of the society. Society bonding, meetings, savings, and various income-generating activities are carried out through a cooperative society. About 1500 cooperative societies have been formed in the Ashrayan project.

Credit 
After completion of trade-based training, every trained-up family is provided with tk. 30 thousand as a loan with 7% taka as a service charge to gear up the income of the families. The given loan continues as a revolving fund. A number of 1,42,718 families have been provided loans.

VGF 
10 kgs of wheat per month are given to the rehabilitated families for up to 3 months to meet up their transitional demand.

Community Centre 
The community center is constructed in every Ashrayan project for social activities of the beneficiaries, meetings of the cooperative society, adult education center, etc. A number of 2201 Community centers have been built in Ashrayan projects.

Pond and Ghatla 
According to the availability of land, a pond is dug out at every Ashrayan village for fish cultivation and to meet the daily demand for water. A number of 466 Ghatla have been constructed in the pond of the Ashrayan project.

Internal road 
The internal road is constructed in every Ashrayan village for smooth movements of the beneficiaries.

Electricity 
Electricity is connected with every Ashrayan village through REB except the areas where the national grid line is unavailable. A number of 1110 village has been brought under electrification.

Tree plantation 
Trees (fruit and wood) are planted in every Ashrayan project through Forest department. Planted trees are proportionately distributed among the beneficiaries. Nearly 15,54,674 trees have been planted in the Ashrayan-2 project.

Latrine–Bathroom 
In order to ensure good health and a clean environment a sufficient number of latrines and bathrooms are established in every Asharayan project.

Deep/Swallow tube wells: In order to ensure pure drinking water a good number of deep/swallow tube wells are set up in every Asharayan project.

Family planning 
To ensure birth control, and good health for mother and child family planning dept. plays an active role in every Asharayan project.

Education 
To ensure literacy for children Upazila Education Officers take necessary steps in every Asharayan project.

Special activities by Ashrayan project

The rehabilitation of the Hijra Community 
The Hatikumrul Ashrayan project, implemented in Ullapara Upazila of Sirajganj district, is different from other projects. The Hatikumrul Ashrayan Project has rehabilitated the Hijra community, the backward third gender. There have been constructed four semi-pucca barracks and rehabilitated twenty-five people in the project. The Hon'ble Prime Minister inaugurated the project on 23 January 2021. Ashrayan project allocated necessary funds for trade-based training and loans for the beneficiaries to improve their living standards. There have been established a cattle firm and arranged sewing machines in the project through a public-private partnership. Besides, there have been arrangements for poultry, pigeon rearing, and vegetable production.

It is also mentionable that the Ashrayan project has rehabilitated 125 third-gender people in the CI sheet barrack of the Manabpalli Special Ashraayn Project adjacent to Bangibecha Bridge in Sadar Upazila of Dinajpur District in the financial year 2011-12. Vocational training and micro-credit have been provided to the beneficiaries to improve their living standards.

Bandabari Ashrayan Project for Leprosy Patients 
The highest number of leprosy patients is in the greater Rangpur area of Bangladesh. Begging was the only means of survival for these leprosy patients abandoned by their families. People with leprosy did not want to come to their area and did not even get proper begging, so they migrated to Dhaka city. Lepers, deprived of basic rights, used to come to Dhaka and stay in the slum area adjacent to the Kamalapur railway station or Agargaon. Since 1996, the Hon'ble Prime Minister has taken various initiatives to eradicate leprosy. Toward the end of the first term in office, they met Prime Minister Sheikh Hasina and requested her to do something for them. The Hon'ble Prime Minister, Sheikh Hasina, immediately directed the authority concerned to undertake special projects with accommodation, ensuring medical, employment, and education of their children. On January 24, 2000, the leprosy-disabled families got a place in the Bandabari Ashrayan Project in Boalia Union of Kaliakair Upazila, surrounded by Gajari Forest in Bhawal about 80 km from Dhaka. Before the Ashrayan project, their address was Kamalapur Railway Station, a slum near the Agargaon Pangu Hospital area. The open sky was their roof. The Ashrayan project became the new shelter for their survival. The Ashrayan project rehabilitated 70 homeless leprosy families in 07 barrack houses. After rehabilitation, various initiatives were taken for their employment. After the implementation of the project, their leprosy has improved on the one hand and, they have moved away from disrespectful begging and joined various professions on the other hand. Many have been able to provide higher education to their children.

Construction of specially designed houses for minority ethnic families in the three hill districts 
As per the direction of the Honorable Prime Minister, Sheikh Hasina, Under the Asrayan-2 project, there has been constructed 38 specially designed houses for 38 small ethnic families affected by fire in Matiranga Upazila of Khagrachhari district in the fiscal year 2012-13, and 176 houses for 176 families in Longodu of Rangamati district in the financial year 2017-18. Besides, 366 specially designed houses have been constructed in Rangamati, Bandarban, and Khagrachhari districts in the financial year 2019-20. In other words, the Ashrayan project has constructed a total of 580 specially designed houses for the small ethnic families of the three hill districts.

Construction of specially designed tong houses for minority ethnic (Rakhine) families 
20 tong houses have been constructed to rehabilitate the families of helpless Rakhine communities in Taltoli Upazila of Barguna district in FY 2017-18.

Dakkin Palasbari Ashrayan project 
Due to the effect of the Baropukuria Coal-mine project some 318 families surrounding the coal-mine area had been affected and lost their homes. According to the direction of the Hon’ble Prime Minister, the Ashrayan project took the initiative and constructed a number of 64 Pucca buildings (5-unit building) to rehabilitate those 318 affected families in the Ashrayan project with the help of the Ministry of Power, Energy, and Mineral Resources.

Rehabilitation of beggars 
As part of the rehabilitation of beggars, a total of 691 houses have been constructed for beggars in Kishoreganj Upazila of Nilphamari district in the financial year 2016-17 and 2017-18. Moreover, as part of the declaration, the Narail district was made a Beggar-free district. Some 311 beggar families have already been rehabilitated through the Ashrayan project in three Upazilas of Narail district (2017–18 and 2017-18 financial year) and 22 more beggar families in the Mujib year i.e. a total of 333 beggar families.

Rehabilitation of the Harijan community 
Some 60 families from the Harijan community have been rehabilitated in the Ashrayan project by constructing some 60 CI sheet barracks in Sadar Upazila of Nilphamari district in the financial year 2017-18.

Khuruskul Ashrayan project 
The Hon'ble Prime Minister Sheikh Hasina directed to rehabilitation of the climate refugee families living in the area adjacent to the Cox's Bazar International Airport on April 3, 2011. In this context, the `Khurushkul special Ashrayan project' was taken up on 253.59 acres of land in Khurushkul mouza of Sadar Upazila of Cox's Bazar district in the financial year 2014-15. Under this project, 4,409 climate refugee families will be rehabilitated in some 139 five-story buildings. To make the project more sustainable, a tourist zone and a sutki (fish fry) mahal are going to be set up. In the meantime, 640 families have been rehabilitated in 19 buildings. Training and loans are being provided to ensure the economic well-being of rehabilitated families. Khurushkul Special Ashrayn project is the largest single climate refugee rehabilitation project in the world.

Sustainable Development Goals (SDGs): Asrayan-2 Project: Achieving SDGs (Sustainable Goals)

SDG Target 1.4

By 2030, ownership and control of economic resources and basic amenities, land, and other assets, in favor of all men and women, especially the poor and vulnerable (established) people, has been mentioned. At the same time, there has been a declaration to establish equal rights in obtaining financial services with micro-credit. 
Comment: Under the Ashrayan project, the ownership of the land is provided with the name of the husband and wife. Priority is given to landless and homeless, disabled, destitute, widows, women abused by husbands, elderly men and women, and their families.

SDG target 1.5

Building impact tolerance for people living in poverty and vulnerabilities and reducing the risks to those affected by climate change. 
Comment: In the coastal areas of Chottogram and Cox's Bazar, 4,409 poor families, who have been displaced due to adverse effects of climate, are being rehabilitated through the Khurushkul Ashrayan project in Cox's Bazar. Construction of 139 five-story buildings is underway for their rehabilitation. It is the largest climate refugee rehabilitation project in the world. 640 families have already been rehabilitated after completing the work of 20 buildings.

SDG target 2.3

Doubling the income and agricultural productivity of small-scale food producers especially women, indigenous peoples, family farmers, pastoralists, and others by ensuring safe and equal access to land and other productive resources and materials. The index has been set to achieve this. 
Comment: Malnutrition is one of the factors that keep poverty alive. On the other hand, the nutritional value of children and adults largely depends on the quality of water, sanitation, and hygiene. Rehabilitated families are engaged in agricultural production in their backyards as they are getting water and sewerage facilities in their new homes.

They are also involved in poultry farming and animal husbandry. For this, training and loan assistance is being given to them through government agencies. Fish farming is being done in the ponds of the project area on a cooperative basis. Small loans are being provided to those who have received vocational training. Training and loans have also been arranged for the people belonging to the small ethnic groups living in the plains.

SDG target 5. a

Necessary reforms to ensure ownership and control of all types of property, including economic resources and land, financial services, inheritance, and equal rights of women in natural resources. 
Comment: The ownership of the land in the joint name of the husband and wife of each landless family benefiting from this project is given in the registry documents. At the same time, names, ledgers, and entries are given in the joint name. As a result, their children will have equal rights in inheritance outside the traditional legal framework.

SDG target 11.5

other disasters, including water-borne disasters, with special emphasis on protecting the poor and vulnerable. 
Comment: Natural disasters such as floods, river erosion, cyclones, tidal surges, etc. directly affect the economic resources of visible resources such as houses, crops, livestock, and other infrastructures. Considering that, every house under the project has been built in a relatively high place. The site has been selected with special care so that houses are not damaged or people's lives are endangered due to natural calamities, river erosion, or heavy rains.

References

1997 establishments in Bangladesh
Organisations based in Dhaka
Government agencies of Bangladesh
Government agencies established in 1997